Mady is a village in Osh Region of Kyrgyzstan. It is part of the Kara-Suu District. Its population was 2,876 in 2021. It was here that Qurmancan Datqa died - one of the famous political figures in Kyrgyz history.

References

Populated places in Osh Region